"Ready to Fall" is the first single by the punk rock band Rise Against from their fourth studio album, The Sufferer & The Witness (2006).

An acoustic version of this song was performed live on the CJZN Radio station in Victoria, British Columbia, on January 18, 2007, before a Billy Talent concert featuring Rise Against, Anti-Flag, and Moneen.

Composition and reception
"Ready to Fall" was the first single from The Sufferer & The Witness, Rise Against's follow-up to its 2004 breakthrough album Siren Song of the Counter Culture For The Sufferer & the Witness, Rise Against's members sought to return to their punk roots. McIlrath commented: "It's definitely more of a punk rock record ... We haven't 'grown or matured' as such, we've just really executed what we've been trying to nail with the last few records." Like most of the songs from The Sufferer & The Witness, "Ready to Fall" is characterized as hardcore punk and melodic hardcore. with a midtempo beat. "Ready to Fall" features a complex song structure, with controlled verses that lead into an intense chorus and screaming vocals, while a continuous bassline plays in the background. The vocals and instrumentation are noticeably heavier than most of the songs on the album.

"Ready to Fall" was released on May 30, as the first single from The Sufferer & The Witness. It was released as a CD and 7" single; the B-side features a live performance of "State of the Union", take from the album Siren Song of the Counter Culture. Commercially, "Ready to Fall" peaked at number thirteen on the Billboard Alternative Songs chart, the bands' highest charting single at the time.

"Ready to Fall" received positive reviews from critics, several of whom described the chorus as "compelling". Davey Boy of Sputnikmusic further praised the song for its controlled verses and intense bridge. Scott Heisel of Alternative Press and Corey Apar of AllMusic noted how "Ready to Fall" emulated Rise Against's older style of music. Heisel in particular said the song was "guaranteed to start circle pits wherever played".

Music video
The accompanying music video was directed by Kevin Kerslake.

Made in 2006, the video is about pollution, environmental destruction, and animal rights. The video is 3 minutes and 51 seconds long. It cuts between shots of the band playing, wild animals, and footage related to the three issues listed. This includes mining, forest clearing, desertification, oil, and melting of polar ice, as well as animals  dead or dying as a result of those practices. It shows footage of hunters, rodeos, animal experimentation, the capture and slaughter of wild dolphins, and animals in captivity. Finally, it features video from several areas of animal agriculture including eggs, fishing, and meat. At the end of the video, lead singer Tim McIlrath says, "Every action has a reaction. We've got one planet, one chance."

As well as the version played on television there was another, more graphic, 'uncut' version created. This was never released officially but is available on certain websites such as Vimeo. The video is focused more on animal rights and serves a testimony to veganism. Rise Against is an active supporter of PETA, an animal rights organization, and the band members are all active vegetarians.

The video was filmed at Brandywine Falls Provincial Park in British Columbia. Much of the footage of animals in both film clips is from the documentary Earthlings.

Credits and personnel
Credits adapted from the liner notes of The Sufferer & the Witness.

Rise Against
 Tim McIlrath – lead vocals, rhythm guitar
 Chris Chasse – lead guitar, backing vocals
 Joe Principe – bass guitar, backing vocals
 Brandon Barnes – drums

Additional personnel
Chad Price - backing vocals

Production
 Bill Stevenson, Jason Livermore – producers
 Bill Stevenson, Jason Livermore – audio engineering
 Chris Lord-Alge – mixing
 Ted Jensen – mastering

Chart performance

References

External links
 

Rise Against songs
2006 singles
Environmental songs
Songs written by Tim McIlrath
Songs written by Joe Principe
Songs written by Brandon Barnes
Melodic hardcore songs